Uddingston and Bellshill is a constituency of the Scottish Parliament (Holyrood) covering part of the council areas of North Lanarkshire and South Lanarkshire. It elects one Member of the Scottish Parliament (MSP) by the plurality (first past the post) method of election. It is also one of nine constituencies in the Central Scotland electoral region, which elects seven additional members, in addition to nine constituency MSPs, to produce a form of proportional representation for the region as a whole.

The constituency was formed for the 2011 Scottish Parliament election, and comprises parts of the former seat of Hamilton North and Bellshill, along with areas that were formerly in the seat of Motherwell and Wishaw.

The seat has been held by Stephanie Callaghan of the Scottish National Party since the 2021 Scottish Parliament election.

Electoral region 

The other nine constituencies of the Central Scotland region are Airdrie and Shotts, Coatbridge and Chryston, Cumbernauld and Kilsyth, East Kilbride, Falkirk East, Falkirk West, Hamilton, Larkhall and Stonehouse and Motherwell and Wishaw.

The region covers all of the Falkirk council area, all of the North Lanarkshire council area and part of the South Lanarkshire council area.

Constituency boundaries and council areas 

The Uddingston and Bellshill Holyrood constituency is one of five covering the North Lanarkshire council area, the others being Airdrie and Shotts, Coatbridge and Chryston, Cumbernauld and Kilsyth and Motherwell and Wishaw. All five are within the Central Scotland electoral region. Part of the constituency includes territory within South Lanarkshire; it is one of five covering the South Lanarkshire council area, the others being Hamilton, Larkhall and Stonehouse and East Kilbride which are within the Central Scotland region, Rutherglen within the Glasgow region, and Clydesdale within the South Scotland region.

At the 2011 Scottish Parliament election, the constituency of Uddingston and Bellshill was fought for the first time. It was created from the electoral wards below:

North Lanarkshire:
Thorniewood (whole ward)
Bellshill (whole ward)
Mossend and Holytown (whole ward)
Motherwell North (shared with Motherwell and Wishaw)
South Lanarkshire:
Bothwell and Uddingston (whole ward)
Blantyre (shared with Rutherglen)
Hamilton North and East (shared with Hamilton, Larkhall and Stonehouse)

Member of the Scottish Parliament

Election results

2020s

2010s

Notes

External links

Scottish Parliament constituencies and regions from 2011
Constituencies of the Scottish Parliament
Constituencies established in 2011
2011 establishments in Scotland
Bothwell and Uddingston
Bellshill
Politics of South Lanarkshire
Politics of North Lanarkshire